George Fowler (26 October 1860 – 14 May 1934) was a New Zealand cricketer who played first-class cricket for Nelson from 1879 to 1887. His brothers Samuel and Louis also played for Nelson.

Cricket career
George Fowler achieved some remarkable bowling figures, especially in Nelson. Against Wellington at the Botanical Gardens ground in 1883-84 he bowled unchanged through both innings and took 5 for 10 and 5 for 13 (match figures of 28.4–16–23–10; five-ball overs) in a match in which 40 wickets fell for just 183 runs. Nine of his victims were bowled. Nelson won by 39 runs. At a temporary ground on the outskirts of Nelson in 1887–88, also against Wellington, he took 6 for 9 and 5 for 16 (match figures of 23.3–11–25–11; five-ball overs again) to give Nelson a nine-wicket victory in a match which was completed in one day. This time 159 runs were scored for 31 wickets.

In the match Nelson played against the touring Australians in 1880-81 at Victory Square in Nelson, Fowler had figures of 32–19–32–4 (four-ball overs) then top-scored with 16 in Nelson's second innings. In the whole match only his brother Samuel, with 30 in Nelson's first innings, made a higher score. He hit his highest score in the match against Auckland at Victory Square in 1882–83, when he made 28 in Nelson's second innings – the second-highest individual score of the match. He also took 2 for 38 and 6 for 42, for match figures of 52–23–80–8. Despite his efforts, Nelson lost by 4 runs.  

Fowler's career bowling figures are not known exactly, as the bowling figures for the second innings of his first first-class match, when he was 19 years old, are unknown. He took four wickets, and the batsmen scored 24, so his figures in the innings were at best 4 for 0 and at worst 4 for 24. Therefore, his career figures were 49 wickets for between 313 and 337, at an average of between 6.38 and 6.87.

References

External links

1860 births
1934 deaths
New Zealand cricketers
Nelson cricketers
Cricketers from Nelson, New Zealand